The 2003 Basingstoke and Deane Council election took place on 1 May 2003 to elect members of Basingstoke and Deane Borough Council in Hampshire, England. One third of the council was up for election and the council stayed under no overall control.

After the election, the composition of the council was:
Conservative 26
Liberal Democrats 15
Labour 15
Independent 4

Election result
Overall turnout in the election was 30.9%.

Following the election the Labour and Liberal Democrat administration continued to run the council with 15 seats each and 30 of the 60 councillors. However the Labour deputy leader Rob Donnelly took over as leader of the council, replacing Liberal Democrat Brian Gurden who became deputy leader.

Ward results

x

References

2003
2003 English local elections
2000s in Hampshire